Rafael Cadalso (9 November 1914 – 22 December 1968) was a Cuban sports shooter. He competed in the 25 m pistol event at the 1948 Summer Olympics.

References

1914 births
1968 deaths
Cuban male sport shooters
Olympic shooters of Cuba
Shooters at the 1948 Summer Olympics
Sportspeople from Havana
20th-century Cuban people